Engelbert Hundertpfund (22 February 1918 in Kematen in Tirol - 1 May 1999) was an Austrian cross-country skier who competed in the 1948 Winter Olympics.

In 1948 he was a member of the Austrian relay team which finished fourth in the 4x10 km relay competition. In the 18 km event he finished 39th.

External links
Engelbert Hundertpfund's profile at Sports Reference.com
Notice of Engelbert Hundertpfund's death

1918 births
1999 deaths
Austrian male cross-country skiers
Olympic cross-country skiers of Austria
Cross-country skiers at the 1948 Winter Olympics
People from Innsbruck-Land District
Sportspeople from Tyrol (state)
20th-century Austrian people